Azerbaijan competed at the 2022 Winter Olympics in Beijing, China, from 4 to 20 February 2022.

The Azerbaijani team consisted of two athletes (one per gender) in figure skating. 

On January 18, 2022, Figure skater Vladimir Litvintsev was named as the opening ceremony flag bearer. A volunteer served as the flagbearer during the closing ceremony.

Competitors
The following is a list of the number of competitors who participated at the Games per sport/discipline.

Figure skating

In the 2021 World Figure Skating Championships in Stockholm, Sweden, Azerbaijan secured one quota in the ladies' singles competition. Later in 2021, at the 2021 CS Nebelhorn Trophy in Oberstdorf, Germany, Azerbaijan qualified an additional berth in the men's singles.

Singles

See also
Azerbaijan at the 2022 Winter Paralympics

References

Nations at the 2022 Winter Olympics
2022
Winter Olympics